Scott Colomby (born September 19, 1952) is an American film, television, and stage actor, best known for his roles in Caddyshack (1980) and Porky's (1982).

Life and career
Colomby was born in Brooklyn, New York on September 19, 1952. His father, Harry, was a jazz agent, manager, and school teacher and his mother, Lee, is a stage actress. While in grade school, his family moved from Brooklyn to Los Angeles. Colomby attended Beverly Hills High School and graduated in 1970. He attended classes for theatre arts at the Immaculate Heart school, where he enjoyed classic readings and decided to make acting his career.

At age 13, he made his acting debut on the daytime soap opera Days of Our Lives (1965). He followed this with a starring role in the Canadian biker film The Proud Rider in 1971. These performances led to a succession of guest roles on several television shows, including Room 222 (1972), Ironside (1974), Phyllis (1975), The Streets of San Francisco (1975), Baretta (1976), Charlie's Angels (1977), and Black Sheep Squadron (1978) among others. Colomby had recurring roles on the sitcom Sons & Daughters in 1974 and the soap opera parody Mary Hartman, Mary Hartman in 1976. He starred on the short-lived comedy Szysznyk with Ned Beatty, and appeared in six episodes of One Day at a Time (1977–78) as Cliff Randall, Barbara Cooper's crush.

In 1980, Colomby played Tony D'Annunzio, the rival of his fellow caddie Danny Noonan, in the golf comedy film Caddyshack. Two years later, he played Brian Schwartz in the sex comedy Porky's (1982). Despite negative reviews, the film was a major success, grossing more than $100 million domestically. Colomby later returned for the film's two less successful sequels, Porky's II: The Next Day (1983) and Porky's Revenge! (1985).

Colomby has continued to act, but his performances have become less frequent since the 1990s. He is the co-founder of Big Elvin & The Professors' Blues Theater, an acting company that provides a grab bag of music, comedy, street theater and performance art.

Filmography

Film

Television

References

External links
 

1952 births
American male film actors
American male stage actors
American male television actors
Beverly Hills High School alumni
Living people
Male actors from New York City
People from Brooklyn